European Studbook may refer to:

 The European Studbook (ESB) of the European Association of Zoos and Aquaria (see also: the European Endangered Species Programme)
 The European Studbook Foundation: focused on reptile and amphibian

See also 
 Studbook (breed registry)